Paul Hanley and Radek Štěpánek were the defending champions, but chose not to participate that year.

Jonathan Erlich and Andy Ram won in the final 6–4, 4–6, 6–3, against Cyril Suk and Pavel Vízner.

Seeds

  Mark Knowles /  Daniel Nestor (semifinals)
  Wayne Black /  Kevin Ullyett (semifinals)
  Cyril Suk /  Pavel Vízner (final)
  Jonathan Erlich /  Andy Ram (champions)

Draw

Draw

External links
 ABN AMRO World Tennis Tournament Main Doubles Draw

Doubles
2005 ATP Tour